Adisson is a surname. Notable people with the surname include:

Frank Adisson (born 1969), French slalom canoeist
Gaelle Adisson (born 1974), American musician

See also
Addison (name)
Alisson